San Pedro de Casta District is one of thirty-two districts of the province Huarochirí in Peru. The town of San Pedro de Casta is known for its proximity to Marcahuasi, and receives the majority of its attention from this tourist attraction.

Access
To get to San Pedro de Casta, one must travel to Chosica and catch a bus. Directly off the western side of the main street of Chosica is a small market where one can find many buses. A bus labeled Marcahuasi or Casta will take travelers and market-goers through the valley heading north out of town to San Pedro de Casta (expect to catch the bus an hour before it is supposed to leave, because it has a rather flimsy schedule). Three to four hours later, the bus will arrive in San Pedro de Casta. In San Pedro de Casta there is one hotel and three restaurants off of the main square where tourists can stay and get food. A few guides and horse owners live near the main square and, if asked, will accommodate travelers schedules for a reasonable price.

San Pedro de Casta is also an interesting destination for travelers who love popular festivities, although one must know the dates of these events. The celebrations tend to last through the night and are always accompanied by at least one band. Celebrations are held regularly throughout the year, centered mainly around days of specific saints and most nationally recognized holidays.

The best time to visit is during the months of June to October, this is the regions time for winter and its dry season.

References